Camping Unlimited is the organization that runs Camp Krem, a camp in the Santa Cruz Mountains that caters to disabled adults and children. Camp Krem provides year-round programs nearly every weekend and summer camp sessions ranging from 7 to 12 days long. In the summer, Camp Krem has a main camp, an Outdoor Adventure Camp, and a Travel Camp that travels throughout California and the country. The camp is located in Boulder Creek, California.

History 

Camping Unlimited is a foundation started by Alex Krem in 1961. Krem, originally a chemist, became a special education teacher and took some of his kids camping in his backyard. Because of the success of these trips, he expanded his program and bought 45 acres of land in 1965.

Camp activities 

At Camp Krem, campers participate in a variety of activities. According to the American Camp Association, some of these activities include:
 Acting
 Aerobics
 Arts and crafts
 Backpacking
 Baseball
 Basketball
 Camping skills/outdoor living
 Cheerleading
 Culinary/cooking
 Dance
 Drama
 Drawing and painting
 Farming/gardening
 Fitness
 Hiking
 Music - instrumental
 Music - vocal
 Nature exposure
 Orienteering
 Rafting
 Swimming
 Volleyball
 Wilderness survival
 Wilderness trips
 Woodworking

Vision, mission, and values 

Camp Krem aims to provide a caring, outdoor environment where children and adults of all developmental disabilities can feel comfortable, safe, and able to try new things. Camp Krem also provides respite for the caretakers of their campers. Some of the disabilities include, but are not limited to, Aspergers, autism, cerebral palsy, Down syndrome, intellectual disabilities, mobility limitations, and Prader-Willi Syndrome.

One of the goals of Camp Krem is to provide "planned permissiveness." This means that campers who do not want to participate in a certain activity do not have to because they are on vacation.

References

Summer camps in California
Buildings and structures in Santa Cruz County, California
Disability in the United States
Summer camps for children with special needs